G protein-coupled receptor kinase 5 is a member of the G protein-coupled receptor kinase subfamily of the Ser/Thr protein kinases, and is most highly similar to GRK4 and GRK6. The protein phosphorylates the activated forms of G protein-coupled receptors to regulate their signaling.

Function 

G protein-coupled receptor kinases phosphorylate activated G protein-coupled receptors, which promotes the binding of an arrestin protein to the receptor. Arrestin binding to phosphorylated, active receptor prevents receptor stimulation of heterotrimeric G protein transducer proteins, blocking their cellular signaling and resulting in receptor desensitization. Arrestin binding also directs receptors to specific cellular internalization pathways, removing the receptors from the cell surface and also preventing additional activation. Arrestin binding to phosphorylated, active receptor also enables receptor signaling through arrestin partner proteins. Thus the GRK/arrestin system serves as a complex signaling switch for G protein-coupled receptors.

GRK5 and the closely related GRK6 phosphorylate receptors at sites that encourage arrestin-mediated signaling rather than arrestin-mediated receptor desensitization, internalization and trafficking (in contrast to GRK2 and GRK3, which have the opposite effect). This difference is one basis for pharmacological biased agonism (also called functional selectivity), where a drug binding to a receptor may bias that receptor’s signaling toward a particular subset of the actions stimulated by that receptor.

GRK5 is widely expressed throughout the body, but with notably high expression in the lung, heart and placenta, with widespread expression at lower levels. 
In humans, a GRK5 sequence polymorphism at residue 41 (leucine rather than glutamine) that is most common in individuals with African ancestry leads to elevated GRK5-mediated desensitization of airway beta2-adrenergic receptors, a drug target in asthma. In the mouse, GRK5 regulates the M2 subtype of Muscarinic acetylcholine receptors in airways and neurons, and mice lacking GRK5 have been proposed as a model for Alzheimer’s disease. In zebrafish and in humans, loss of GRK5 function has been associated with heart defects due to heterotaxy, a series of developmental defects arising from improper left-right laterality during organogenesis. Overexpression of GRK5 in the heart of mice has shown that GRK5 regulates beta2-adrenergic receptors, but GRK5 overexpression or deletion does not affect signaling by the angiotensin II AT1 receptor in the heart.

References

Further reading 

 
 
 
 
 
 
 
 
 
 
 
 
 
 
 
 
 
 
 

EC 2.7.11